Sergio Gallardo (born 22 March 1979) is a Spanish middle distance runner. He specializes in the 1500 metres.

Achievements

Personal bests
800 metres - 1:48.12 min (2002)
1500 metres - 3:34.95 min (2006)
Mile - 3:56.78 min (2003)
3000 metres - 7:48.27 min (2004)

External links

1979 births
Living people
Spanish male middle-distance runners
Competitors at the 2001 Summer Universiade
Athletes (track and field) at the 2005 Mediterranean Games
Mediterranean Games competitors for Spain
21st-century Spanish people